The Samoa national rugby sevens team, referred to as Samoa Sevens or Manu Samoa 7s, competes in the annual World Rugby Sevens Series. Representing the polynesian country of Samoa, with a population of about 202,000, the team competes against some of the wealthiest countries in the world. The Samoa sevens team is overseen by the Samoa Rugby Football Union, which oversees all of rugby union in Samoa.

Samoa won the 2009–10 World Series by winning four tournaments – the Hong Kong Sevens, the USA Sevens, the Adelaide Sevens, and the Edinburgh Sevens. Samoa has played at all Rugby World Cup Sevens finals tournaments since the championship began in 1993; its best finish was third place in 1997 and again in 2007.

Samoa has won four Oceania Sevens titles since the first competition in 2008. They have also won all four gold medals at the Pacific Games Sevens and Pacific Mini Games Sevens between 2007 and 2013, defeating  in the final on each occasion.

History

The first Samoan sevens team was selected in November 1978 to play at the invitation Hong Kong Sevens under the leadership of former SRU representative captain, Tuatagaloa Keli Tuatagaloa. The team included Rev-Dr Faitala Talapusi as captain, Lemalu Roy Slade (Brisbane) as vice-captain, Rev. Paul Gray (Melbourne), Peter Schmidt, Feausiga Sililoto, Andy Leavasa (USA), Salafuti Patu and others. Samoa won the 1993 Hong Kong Sevens.

Tournament history

Summer Olympics

In qualifying rounds for the 2016 Olympics, Samoa finished in third place at the 2015 Oceania Sevens Championship, meaning they didn't qualify directly for the Olympics as Oceania's representative. They instead went to the 2016 inter-continental final qualifying tournament, where they lost to Spain 12–19 in the final and failed to qualify for the 2016 Olympics.

Rugby World Cup Sevens 
1993 Rugby World Cup Sevens - Murrayfield, Scotland

Western Samoa was in Pool D with England, Canada, Spain, Namibia and Hong Kong. After the first of Pool games Western Samoa remained undefeated along with South Africa and New Zealand.

In the Quarterfinals Western Samoa was in Pool E alongside Tonga Fiji and Ireland. Western Samoa only win was against Tonga 42-7.

Team List

Coach: Taufusi Salesa

Manager: Marina Schaffhausen

 Andrew Aiolupo (Moata'a)
 Alama Ieremia (Wellington)
 Danny Kaleopa (Moata'a)
 Lolani Koko (Moata'a)
 Brian Lima (Marist St Joseph)
 Veli Patu (Vaiala)
 Ofisa Tonu'u (Wellington)
 To'o Vaega (Vaiala)
 Sila Vaifale (Marist St Joseph)
 Alefaio Vaisuai (Moata'a)

1997 Rugby World Cup Sevens - British Hong Kong

Western Samoa was in Pool C with Argentina and Morocco won both of its games. Western Samoa advanced to the Cup Quarter - finals to play England, winning 21 - 5.   In the Cup Semi – Finals lost to eventual winners Fiji 38-14. 

Team List

 Kalolo Toleafoa
 Isaac Fe'aunati
 Rudolf Moors
 Brian Lima
 Tainafi Patu
 Afato So'oalo
 Terry Fanolua
 Sila Vaifale
 Laiafi Papali'i
 Semo Sititi

2001 Rugby World Cup Sevens - Argentina

Western Samoa was in Pool D alongside Australia, Wales, United States, Portugal and Hong Kong. Western Samoa advanced to the Cup Quarterfinal, where they would meet New Zealand and eventually exit the tournament with a loss 45 -7.    

Team List

Coach: Filipo Saena

 Tim Cowley
 Gaolo Elisara
 Ron Fanuatanu
 Daniel Farani
 Ailaoa Samania
 Toa Samania
 Semo Sititi
 Steven So'oialo
 Luke Mealamu
 Tanner Vili

2005 Rugby World Cup Sevens -  Hong Kong

Samoa was in Pool B alongside England, France, Georgia, Chinese Taipei and Italy. Three teams Samoa, England and France won four of its five pool games but Samoa did not advance to the Cup Quarterfinals because the Points For and Points Against difference was lower of the second placed France. England (+123), France (+82) and Samoa (+79).

Samoa move on the Plate competition and win against Ireland Quarter-finals (19-14), then beat Russia in Semi-finals (19-12) and eventually defeating Portugal to secure the World Cup Plate Final for 2005

Team List

Coach:  John Schuster

 Lome Fa'atau
 Sailosi Tagicakibau
 Paul Perez
 Junior Leota
 Kiri Mariner
 Gaolo Elisara
 Apoua Stewart
 Brian Lima
 Uale Mai
 Samu Eteuati
 Mark Tanuvasa
 David Lemi

Commonwealth Games

World Rugby Sevens Series 

While long a solidly competitive side, Samoa emerged as contenders in the 2006-07 Sevens World Series, finishing third overall while winning two events – the Wellington Sevens and Hong Kong Sevens. The team reached the final four times in a row, playing against series favourite Fiji.

2009–10 IRB Sevens World Series 
Samoa won the 2009–10 Series in large part due to 2010 World Rugby Sevens Player of the Year Mikaele Pesamino who led all players with 56 tries scored. Samoa were also helped by the efforts of half-back Lolo Lui, another nominee for 2010 Sevens Player of the Year, who scored 264 points. Samoa's third star that season was forward Alafoti Faosiliva, who scored 29 tries and was also a Sevens Player of the Year nominee.

The itinerary for the 2009–10 IRB Sevens World Series:

Overall Standings

Sevens Series tournament Cup wins

In July 1997, the Government of Samoa changed the country's name from Western Samoa to Samoa.

Team

Current squad
Squad Named for the Hong Kong round of the 2022/2023 HSBC World 7s Series.

Former squads

Squad to 2015 Pacific Games:
Fa’alemiga Selesele
Tila Mealoi
Tunufai Tunufai 
Phoenix Hunapo-Nofoa
Alefosio Tapili
Alex Samoa
Tomasi Alosio
Belgium Tuatagaloa
Alamanda Motuga
Ed Fidow
Savelio Ropati
Samoa Toloa

Notable former players
Two of the highest points and try scorers in series history, Uale Mai and Mikaele Pesamino, played for Samoa. Pesamino was also named the 2010 IRB International Sevens Player of the Year, an honour which Uale Mai, a former team captain and one of the most capped players in the sport, had won in 2006. Captain Lolo Lui and teammate Alafoti Fa'osiliva had also been nominated.

Player records
The following table shows Samoa's statistical career leaders in the World Rugby Sevens Series. Players in bold are still active. Mikaele Pesamino is Samoa's top try scorer in the World Rugby Sevens Series. He was the overall top try score in both the 2006–07 (43 tries) and the 2009–10 (56 tries) seasons.

Coaches

The current coach is Brian Lima, former player of the Samoa national rugby sevens team.

Past coaches include: 
 Lilomaiava Taufusi Salesa coached the 1993 Hong Kong Sevens winning team.  
 Fuimaono Titimaea "Dicky" Tafua coached the team on the 2005-2006 IRB Sevens Circuit where they qualified to two finals ( the London Sevens, where they lost to South Africa, and the Paris Sevens where they lost to Fiji). Fuimaono resigned from coaching in 2007 to his new post as Secretary to Samoa's Head of State, Tupua Tamasese Tufuga Efi. 
 Damian McGrath won a Cup in Paris was sacked by the SRU controversially.
 Galumalemana Rudolph Moors took over as coach, but after a disappointing team performance in the 2008–09 Series he was temporarily replaced by Lilomaiava Taufusi Salesa for the final two legs of the series. 
 Stephen Betham was named as Moors' successor in 2009.

Other statistics

See also
 Samoa national rugby union team
 Rugby union in Samoa

References

External links
 Official Samoa Rugby Union website
 Samoa Sevens on facebook
 Manu Samoa Supporters Website